Eugoa mindanensis is a moth of the family Erebidae. It is found in the Philippines.

References

 Natural History Museum Lepidoptera generic names catalog

mindanensis
Moths described in 1928